The Red Barn restaurant was a fast-food restaurant chain founded in 1961 in Springfield, Ohio, by Don Six, Martin Levine, and Jim Kirst. In 1963, the small chain was purchased by Richard O. Kearns, operated as Red Barn System, with the offices moving briefly to Dayton, Ohio and in August 1964 to Fort Lauderdale, Florida. During the late 1960s United Servomation, also called Servomation, bought the Red Barn chain. In 1978 United Servomation merged with the City Investing Company's GDV division which also owned the Motel 6 motel chain. Only interested in real estate, construction, and financial services the new owners ceased advertising for the chain along with allowing the franchise leases to expire with the last of the leases expiring around 1988.  At its peak, Red Barn had 300–400 restaurants in 19 states, as well as outlets in southern Ontario, elsewhere in Canada, and Australia.

Following the shutdown of operations, most of the Red Barn buildings were converted for other uses. A few of the chain restaurants were renamed "The Farm" in various states and continued serving the same menu items available when they were under their Red Barn franchise. There were two locations under "The Farm" name in Racine, Wisconsin and Bradford, Pennsylvania that served the same menu items. The Bradford location closed for a brief period in 2014 from a small fire and permanently closed in December 2015. The Racine, Wisconsin store closed on February 2, 2020. The Australian Red Barn stores were sold  and converted into McDonald's locations.

Starting in the early 2000s, there was a wave of Red Barn nostalgia as evidenced by Facebook groups popping up.  As of 2022, there are several groups with thousands of members.  Some of them have called upon an interested entrepreneur(s) to bring back Red Barn as they thought it would be successful.

History

Building design

Originally, the Red Barn restaurants were in the shape of barns with a glass front and limited seating. The design of the building was patented in 1962 by Red Barn Systems, Incorporated of Springfield, Ohio, which granted the franchise licenses. Later buildings had the familiar fast-food style mansard roof which allowed them to comply to more local building codes.

Menu items

They were known for "Big Barney" (a hamburger similar to a Big Mac) and the "Barnbuster" (similar to a Quarter Pounder or Whopper.)
The chain was quite forward-looking with their food choices: the Big Barney predated the Big Mac by a few years, and it was the first chain to have self-service salad bars.

Advertising and promotions

The restaurant chain had a TV commercial jingle whose lyrics were: "When the hungries hit / When the hungries hit / Hit the Red Barn." Another commercial jingle used in North East Ohio included the line "You'll find more of what you are hankerin' for, at the Red Barn." Three mascots were used in the franchise's commercials: "Hamburger Hungry" (a humanoid figure with a hamburger in bun for a head); "Chicken Hungry" (a chicken leg); and "Big Fish Hungry" (a blue fish).

In Australia, the appearance of Red Barney was common on Cartoon Corner with Daryl Somers. He was an affable clown who gave away prizes and preceded Ronald McDonald.

In the spring of 1970, the chain found itself at the center of controversy when a franchisee wanted to erect a store in Dinkytown, a neighborhood adjacent to the University of Minnesota-East Bank campus in Minneapolis MN. Protestors, who were already riding a wave of anti-corporatism, as well as an anti-Vietnam war sentiment, occupied a vacant building on the property in which the Red Barn franchisee owned. The franchisee eventually demolished the building. However, the restaurant was never built, and the property was later sold off. However a Red Barn location opened nearby in Stadium Village.

See also
 List of defunct fast-food restaurant chains
 List of hamburger restaurants

References

External links
Red Barn Memories from the 60s and 70s at MarlowHeights60sand70s.com
The Farm in Bradford Pennsylvania
The Farm in Racine Wisconsin
Facebook Group "I Remember the Red Barn Restaurants"
Youtube Video "Red Barn Family Restaurants 1979 TV commercial"

Defunct fast-food chains in the United States
Defunct restaurant chains in the United States
Fast-food hamburger restaurants
Defunct restaurants in Ohio
Defunct companies based in Ohio
Companies based in Dayton, Ohio
American companies established in 1961
Restaurants established in 1961
Restaurants disestablished in 1988
1961 establishments in Ohio
1988 disestablishments in Ohio